The 2018 African Handball Champions League is the 40th edition, organized by the African Handball Confederation, under the auspices of the International Handball Federation, the handball sport governing body. The tournament will be held from October 19–28, 2018 at Côte d’Ivoire

Draw

Group A

References 

African Handball Champions League
2017 in African handball